Didargah-e Sofla (also Romanized as Dīdārgāh-e Soflá; also known as Dīdārgāh-e Pā‘īn) is a village in Margha Rural District, in the Central District of Izeh County, Khuzestan Province, Iran. At the 2006 census, its population was 30, in 6 families.

References 

Populated places in Izeh County